Franz Cisar (28 November 1908 – August 1943) was an Austrian footballer whose career lasted from 1926 to 1938.

Club career
Cisar played for several Austrian clubs before moving abroad for a season at FC Metz in France.

International career
A defender, his most prominent moment came during the 1934 FIFA World Cup when he was a member of the Austria national football team.

Death
In the Second World War Cisar served as 'Obergefreiter' (Corporal) in a German Army tank regiment when he was killed in action on the Eastern Front in Russia in August 1943, aged 34. He had already been wounded in action.

References

External links

1908 births
Place of birth missing
1943 deaths
Austrian footballers
Austria international footballers
1934 FIFA World Cup players
FC Metz players
Ligue 1 players
Austrian expatriate footballers
Expatriate footballers in France
Association football defenders
German Army soldiers of World War II
German Army personnel killed in World War II